Lake City, California may refer to:
 Lake City, Modoc County, California
 Lake City, Nevada County, California
 Burnt Ranch, California, in Klamath County; previously known as "Lake City"